Alexis Hanquinquant (born 28 December 1985) is a French Paralympic triathlete. At the 2020 Summer Paralympics, he won a gold medal in the Men's PTS4 event.

References

External links
 
 
 

1985 births
Living people
French male triathletes
Paratriathletes of France
Paralympic gold medalists for France
Paralympic medalists in paratriathlon
Paratriathletes at the 2020 Summer Paralympics
Medalists at the 2020 Summer Paralympics
21st-century French people